Dawson Tayrone Odums  is an American football coach.  He is the head coach at Norfolk State University, a position he has held since 2021. Odums served as the interim head football coach at Clark Atlanta University for one season, in 2004, and head football coach at Southern University and A&M College from 2013 to 2020.

Coaching career
Odums agreed to a three-year contract extension as head football coach with Southern University as reported by the Advocate and confirmed by his agent Burton Rocks on January 17, 2014.
On January 21, 2015 it was reported in the Advocate that Bethune-Cookman had asked for, and received, permission to speak with Coach Odums regarding their own head coaching vacancy.
On April 20, 2021 Odums agreed to a six-year deal with Norfolk State to become the new head coach.

Head coaching record

Notes

References

External links
 Norfolk State profile
 Southern profile

Year of birth missing (living people)
Living people
Bethune–Cookman Wildcats football coaches
Clark Atlanta Panthers football coaches
Gardner–Webb Runnin' Bulldogs football coaches
Georgia Southern Eagles football coaches
Norfolk State Spartans football coaches
North Carolina A&T Aggies football coaches
North Carolina Central Eagles football players
Southern Jaguars football coaches
High school football coaches in North Carolina
People from Shelby, North Carolina
Coaches of American football from North Carolina
Players of American football from North Carolina
African-American coaches of American football
African-American players of American football
20th-century African-American sportspeople
21st-century African-American sportspeople